Luís Filipe Montenegro Cardoso de Morais Esteves (born 16 February 1973) is a Portuguese politician who is the President of the Social Democratic Party (PSD). He was a member of the Assembly of the Republic from the Aveiro District from 2002 to 2018, leading his party's parliamentary group from 2011. He was defeated by Rui Rio in his party's 2020 leadership election, and won against Jorge Moreira da Silva in 2022.

Biography

Education and local politics
Montenegro was born in Porto and raised in Espinho in the Aveiro District. He graduated in Law from the Catholic University of Portugal (the same profession as his father and grandfather), and was president of the Social Democratic Youth in Espinho from 1994 to 1996. He served on the city's council from 1997 to 2001, and ran for mayor in 2005, losing to José Mota of the Socialist Party (PS) by a 45% to 38% margin.

Assembly of the Republic
In 2002, 29-year-old Montenegro was elected to the Assembly of the Republic for the Aveiro District. He became the PSD parliamentary group's deputy leader to Miguel Macedo in 2010, and he received 86% of the votes to lead the group in June 2011, after PSD member Pedro Passos Coelho had been elected prime minister.

The early years of Montenegro's leadership coincided with the European troika intervention to deal with the financial crisis; he was criticised in January 2014 for saying "the life of the people is no better, but the life of the country is a lot better". He left parliament in February 2018 after the defeat of Passos Coelho, warning that the PSD should not turn into new leader "Rui Rio's group of friends".

Leader of the PSD

In January 2020, Montenegro was a candidate in the PSD leadership election, challenging Rio. During the campaign, Rio attacked Montenegro for being a Freemason. In the run-off, Rio won with 53.2% of the votes.

Rio resigned following the PSD's poor performance in the 2022 Portuguese legislative election. Montenegro was the first person to put himself forward for the party leadership election, in which he ran against former minister Jorge Moreira da Silva. Montenegro won with 72.47% of the votes, beating his opponent in every district.

Personal life
Montenegro was nicknamed Ervilha ("Pea") as a child for being small, round-figured and green-eyed, while his immediate family knew him by his middle name, Filipe. He took part in football and beach volleyball, and worked as a lifeguard as a youth, later taking up golf. As of May 2022, he is married and has two children.

A variety of sources dating from 2012, including SAPO's Polígrafo fact-checking website, Público, Expresso, Jornal de Negócios and Diário de Notícias maintain that in 2008, Montenegro was admitted into the Mozart Lodge, a Masonic lodge comprising politicians, businessmen and spies. In 2019, Montenegro denied being a Freemason.

Electoral history
PSD leadership election, 2020

|- style="background-color:#E9E9E9"
! align="center" rowspan=2 colspan=2 style="width:  60px"|Candidate
! align="center" colspan=2 style="width:  50px"|1st round
! align="center" colspan=2 style="width:  50px"|2nd round
|-
! align="center" style="width:  50px"|Votes
! align="center" style="width:  50px"|%
! align="center" style="width:  50px"|Votes
! align="center" style="width:  50px"|%
|-
|bgcolor=orange|
| align=left | Rui Rio
| align=right | 15,546
| align=right | 49.0
| align=right | 17,157
| align=right | 53.2
|-
|bgcolor=orange|
| align=left | Luís Montenegro
| align=right | 13,137
| align=right | 41.4
| align=right | 15,086
| align=right | 46.8
|-
|bgcolor=orange|
| align=left | Miguel Pinto Luz
| align=right | 3,030
| align=right | 9.6
|colspan="2"| 
|-
| colspan=2 align=left | Blank/Invalid ballots
| align=right | 369
| align=right | –
| align=right | 341
| align=right | –
|-
|- style="background-color:#E9E9E9"
| colspan=2 style="text-align:left;" |   Turnout
| align=right | 32,082
| align=right | 79.01
| align=right | 32,582
| align=right | 80.20
|-
| colspan="6" align=left|Source: Official results
|}

PSD leadership election, 2022

|- style="background-color:#E9E9E9"
! align="center" colspan=2 style="width:  60px"|Candidate
! align="center" style="width:  50px"|Votes
! align="center" style="width:  50px"|%
|-
|bgcolor=orange|
| align=left | Luís Montenegro
| align=right | 19,241
| align=right | 72.5
|-
|bgcolor=orange|
| align=left | Jorge Moreira da Silva
| align=right | 7,306
| align=right | 27.5
|-
| colspan=2 align=left | Blank/Invalid ballots
| align=right | 437
| align=right | –
|-
|- style="background-color:#E9E9E9"
| colspan=2 style="text-align:left;" |   Turnout
| align=right | 26,984
| align=right | 60.46
|-
| colspan="4" align=left|Source: Official results
|}

References

1973 births
Living people
People from Porto
People from Espinho, Portugal
Catholic University of Portugal alumni
Social Democratic Party (Portugal) politicians
Members of the Assembly of the Republic (Portugal)
Portuguese Freemasons